Neoponera villosa, known generally as hairy panther ant, is a species of ant in the family Formicidae. Other common names include the greater Texas bullet ant and giant hunting ant.

References

Further reading

External links

 

Ponerinae